Captain Horatio Hornblower (a.k.a. Captain Horatio Hornblower R.N. in the UK, "R.N." standing for "Royal Navy") is a 1951 British naval swashbuckling war film in Technicolor from Warner Bros., produced by Gerry Mitchell, directed by Raoul Walsh, that stars Gregory Peck, Virginia Mayo, Robert Beatty and Terence Morgan.

The film is based on three of C. S. Forester's Horatio Hornblower novels: The Happy Return (1937), A Ship of the Line (1938), and Flying Colours (1938). Forester is credited with the screen adaptation.

Plot
In 1807, during the Napoleonic Wars, Royal Navy Captain Horatio Hornblower commands the 38-gun frigate HMS Lydia on a secret mission to Central America. He is to provide arms and support to a megalomaniac named Don Julian Alvarado, who calls himself "El Supremo" ("The Almighty"), in his rebellion against Spain, an ally of Britain's enemy France.

Upon arrival, Hornblower is told that a larger, much more powerful Spanish warship, the 60-gun Natividad, has been sighted. When it anchors nearby, Hornblower and his crew board and capture it in a surprise night attack. He then reluctantly hands the ship over to Alvarado to appease the madman, and they go their separate ways.

Later, he encounters a Spanish lugger and learns that Spain has switched sides, so the Lydia will have to attack the Natividad again. Two passengers transfer to the Lydia (over Hornblower's strenuous objections): Lady Barbara Wellesley and her maid, fleeing a yellow fever epidemic. As Lady Barbara is the (fictitious) sister of the Duke of Wellington (Historically, Wellesley, in 1807, was not yet the 1st Duke of Wellington as this title was only bestowed to him in 1814.), Hornblower cannot refuse her request for passage to England.

Using superior seamanship and masterful tactics, Hornblower sinks the more powerful Natividad. When the Lydia's surgeon is killed during the battle, Lady Barbara insists on tending the wounded. When she later falls gravely ill, Hornblower nurses her back to health. On the voyage back to England, they fall in love. However, when she speaks of her feelings (although she is engaged), Hornblower gently tells her he is married. Later they meet in a passageway and embrace passionately. She promises her maid's discretion, but he says that they are not free.

After arriving home, Hornblower learns that his wife has died in childbirth, leaving him an infant son. Later, he is given command of the Sutherland, a 74-gun ship of the line captured from the French, and is assigned to a squadron commanded by Rear Admiral Leighton. Leighton has just returned from his honeymoon with Lady Barbara. Outside the Admiralty, Lady Barbara tells Hornblower that she did not learn of his wife’s death until she returned from Ireland. Leighton's squadron is to help enforce the British blockade of France.

Hornblower learns that four French ships of the line have broken through the blockade. Leighton assumes they will make for the Mediterranean, but Hornblower suggests that they mean to support Napoleon's campaign on the Iberian Peninsula. Leighton decides to cover both possibilities by detaching one ship to patrol the French coast. When he learns that Hornblower's Sutherland is best suited for this task, having the shallowest draught, he accuses Hornblower of pursuing glory and prize money and expressly forbids Hornblower's taking any independent action if he sights the French.

Hornblower's French-built ship is subsequently mistaken for a friendly vessel by a small French brig, which flies the enemy's recognition signal for the day. After capturing the vessel, Hornblower learns from its captain that he was transporting supplies to the four warships for use in Spain. Rather than return to the squadron, Hornblower enters the enemy harbour where the French ships are anchored and guarded by a well-armed fort. By flying a French flag and the recognition signal and taking advantage of his ship's French design, Hornblower fools the garrison into believing that the Sutherland is friendly. His gun crews dismast all four enemy ships before cannon fire from the fort forces the British to abandon ship. Hornblower scuttles his ship in the channel, bottling up the French ships.

As the rest of the British squadron arrives to complete the job, Hornblower, First Lieutenant Bush, and seaman Quist are taken by carriage to Paris to be tried for piracy. They escape en route and make their way to the port of Nantes. Disguised as Dutch officers, they board the Witch of Endor, a captured British ship. They overpower the skeleton crew, free a working party of British prisoners of war to man her, and sail to England.

Hornblower is hailed as a national hero and learns that Leighton was killed in the battle against the French ships. Hornblower returns home to visit his young son and finds Lady Barbara there. The two embrace.

Cast
 Gregory Peck as Captain Horatio Hornblower, R.N.
 Virginia Mayo as Lady Barbara Wellesley
 Robert Beatty as First Lieutenant William Bush
 Terence Morgan as Second Lieutenant Gerard
 Moultrie Kelsall as Third Lieutenant Crystal
 James Kenney as Midshipman Longley
 James Robertson Justice as Seaman Quist
 Denis O'Dea as Rear Admiral Sir Rodney Leighton
 Richard Hearne as Polwheal
 Michael J. Dolan as Surgeon Gundarson
 Stanley Baker as Mr. Harrison
 Alec Mango as El Supremo/Don Julian Alvarado
 Christopher Lee as the Spanish captain of the Natividad
 Diane Cilento as the voice of Maria, Hornblower's wife
 Alan Tilvern as Admiral Don Jose Hernandez
 John Witty as Captain Entenza
 Jack Watson as Capt. Sylvester (uncredited)
 Alexander Davion as Spanish officer (uncredited)

Casting
Warner Bros. acquired the film rights to the first three Hornblower novels – The Happy Return, A Ship of the Line, and Flying Colours – as a star vehicle for Errol Flynn when they were first published. For reasons that may have included the financial failure of the 1948 Adventures of Don Juan, the growing difficulties of working with the actor, and/or his advancing age, Flynn was not cast. Warner's was already building up Burt Lancaster as their new swashbuckling screen star, but the role of a British sea captain seemed to be outside his range, so Peck was ultimately cast on a loan-out from David O. Selznick, who received screen credit in the opening titles. Virginia Mayo was only cast after a number of high-profile British actresses were either not free or not interested. Peck's personal choice was Margaret Leighton. Studio head Jack Warner found Virginia Mayo more attractive.

Production
El Supremo's Fortress is Fort de Brégançon in France. To save costs, the Hispaniola set from the 1950 Disney film adaptation of Treasure Island was reused as the frigate HMS Lydia. Instead of moving the horizon background in order to simulate movement on the water, the ship itself was rocked. This caused many problems because of the combined weight of ship, crew and equipment. The Italian brigantine Marcel B. Surdo represented the Witch of Endor for all at-sea exterior footage. The Marcel B. Surdo would also appear in such seafaring films as The Crimson Pirate, The Master of Ballantrae, and John Paul Jones. The explosive and fire effects were supervised by Cliff Richardson.

Premiere and reception
The film had its worldwide premiere in the presence of Princess Margaret at the Warner Theatre, Leicester Square, London on 12 April 1951. The premiere was in aid of King George's Fund for Sailors and the "Foudroyant" appeal (the presently restored frigate renamed  afloat in the Historic Quay, Hartlepool, UK).

Bosley Crowther, critic for The New York Times, said it has "plenty of action ... It may be conventional action, routine in pattern and obviously contrived, with less flavor [of the books] in it than of the workshops of Hollywood. However, it should please those mateys who like the boom of the cannon and the swish of the swords." Bob Thomas said it "is excellent adventure stuff ... the dialogue and action can be stilted at times. But there is enough eye-catching excitement and color to offset that." TV Guide wrote that "Walsh's direction has no time to linger. Guy Green's camerawork and Robert Farnon's jolly score are helpful."

According to Warner Bros' accounts, the film earned $2,598,000 domestically and $2,735,000 foreign. It was the studio's most expensive film of the year but also their most popular.  It was the 9th most popular film at the British box office that year.

The film has been well received by modern critics. The film review aggregator website Rotten Tomatoes gives it 7.3 out of 10 and a 100% "fresh" rating.

Other versions
Peck and Mayo recreated their roles on a one-hour Lux Radio Theater program broadcast on 21 January 1952, which is included as an audio-only feature in the film's DVD release.

Home media
On 6 March 2007 Warner Home Video released the film on DVD in its original aspect ratio of 1:37:1.

References

External links

 
 
 
 
 
 
 Captain Horatio Hornblower review at DVD Journal
 Captain Horatio Hornblower (1951) review at Decent Films Guide

1951 films
1951 romantic drama films
1950s historical action films
1951 war films
1950s adventure drama films
British historical action films
British romantic drama films
British war drama films
Films shot at Associated British Studios
1950s English-language films
Films based on British novels
Films based on historical novels
Films based on the Hornblower series
Films based on military novels
Films based on multiple works of a series
Films directed by Raoul Walsh
Films set in 1807
Films set in Central America
Seafaring films
War adventure films
Warner Bros. films
1950s British films